General Gore may refer to:

Charles Stephen Gore (1793–1869), British Army general
John F. Gore (born 1926), U.S. Marine Corps major general
Ralph Gore, 1st Earl of Ross (1725–1802), British Army general